The Holocaust in the Netherlands was part of the European-wide Holocaust organized by Nazi Germany and took place in the German-occupied Netherlands.
In 1939, there were some 140,000 Dutch Jews living in the Netherlands, among them some 24,000 to 25,000 German-Jewish refugees who had fled from Germany in the 1930s. (Other sources claim that some 34,000 Jewish refugees entered the Netherlands between 1933 and 1940, mostly from Germany and Austria).

Some 75% of the Dutch-Jewish population was murdered in the Holocaust. The 1947 census reported 14,346 Jews, or 10% of the pre-war population. This further decrease is attributed to massive emigration of Jews to the then British Mandate of Palestine (present-day Israel).

Overview

The Nazi occupation force estimated the number of (racially) Dutch Jews in 1941 at some 154,000. In the Nazi census, some 121,000 persons declared they were members of the (Ashkenazi) Dutch-Israelite community; 4,300 persons declared they were members of the (Sephardic) Portuguese-Israelite community. Some 19,000 persons reported having two Jewish grandparents (it is generally believed a proportion of this number had three Jewish grandparents, but declined to state that number, for fear that they would be classified as Jews rather than half-Jews by the Nazi authorities). Some 6,000 persons reported having one Jewish grandparent. Some 2,500 persons who were counted in the census as Jewish were members of a Christian church, mostly Dutch Reformed, Calvinist Reformed or Roman Catholic.

In 1941, most Dutch Jews were living in Amsterdam. The census in 1941 indicates the geographical spread of Dutch Jews at the beginning of World War II (province; number of Jewsthis number is not based on the racial standards of the Nazis, but by how people identified in the census):
 Groningen – 4,682
 Friesland – 851
 Drenthe – 2,498
 Overijssel – 4,345
 Gelderland – 6,663
 Utrecht – 4,147
 North Holland – 87,026 (including 79,410 in Amsterdam)
 South Holland – 25,617
 Zeeland – 174
 North Brabant – 2,320
 Limburg – 1,394
 Total – 139,717

In 1945, only about 35,000 Jews of the Netherlands were alive. The exact number of "full Jews" who survived the Holocaust is estimated to be 34,379 (of whom 8,500 were part of a mixed marriages, and thus spared deportation and possible murder in the Nazi concentration camps). The number of "half Jews" who survived in the Netherlands at the end of the Second World War in 1945 is estimated to be 14,545; the number of "quarter Jews" was 5,990.
Some 75% of the Dutch-Jewish population was murdered in the Holocaust, an unusually high percentage compared with the other occupied countries in western Europe.

Factors that influenced the greater number of people who were murdered included that the governmental apparatus was relatively intact after the royal family and government fled to London. The Netherlands was not under a military regime. It was the most densely inhabited country of Western Europe, making it difficult for the relatively large number of Jews to go into hiding. Most Jews in Amsterdam were poor, which limited their options for flight or hiding. The country did not have much open space or woods for people to flee to. Also, the civil administration had detailed records that indicated the numbers of Jews, and where they lived. The average citizen of the Netherlands was unaware of the operation of "death camps" for the majority of the occupation. All Dutch citizens were obligated to "register" and undertake work in Germany. When the Dutch recognised German persecution of the Jews in the Netherlands, they conducted the first act of mass civil disobedience in occupied Europe during WWII: the Februaristaking ("February strike"), to show their support for Jewish citizens.

One theory is that the Germans made use of the administrative organizations and Dutch police:
"In their preparations for the extermination of the Jews living in the Netherlands, the Germans could count on the assistance of the greater part of the Dutch administrative infrastructure. The occupiers had to employ only a relatively limited number of their own personnel; Dutch policemen rounded up the families to be sent to their deaths in Eastern Europe. Trains of the Dutch railways staffed by Dutch employees transported the Jews to camps in the Netherlands which were transit points to Auschwitz, Sobibor, and other death camps." With respect to Dutch collaboration, Eichmann is quoted as saying "The transports run so smoothly that it is a pleasure to see."

During the first year of the occupation of the Netherlands, Jews, who were already registered on basis of their faith with the authorities (just as Protestants, Catholics and others were), had to get a large "J" stamped in their IDs. Every Dutch resident had to declare whether or not they had "Jewish" roots. The Germans banned Jews from certain occupations and isolated them from public life. Starting in January 1942, some Dutch Jews were forced to move to Amsterdam; others were directly deported to Westerbork, a transit and concentration camp near the small village of Hooghalen. Westerbork was founded in 1939 by the Dutch government as the Central Refugee Camp to give shelter to Jews fleeing Nazi persecution following Kristallnacht. After the German occupation of the Netherlands in 1940, it became a transit camp for Jews who were being deported to the Nazi concentration camps in Middle and Eastern Europe, and later to extermination camps. Nearly all the prisoners who left Westerbork for the east were murdered in the Holocaust before the end of World War II.

All non-Dutch Jews were also sent to Westerbork. In addition, over 15,000 Jews were sent to labour camps. Deportations of Jews from the Netherlands to German-occupied Poland and Germany began on 15 June 1942 and ended on 13 September 1944. Ultimately some 101,000 Jews were deported in 98 transports from Westerbork to Auschwitz (57,800; 65 transports), Sobibor (34,313; 19 transports), Bergen-Belsen (3,724; 8 transports) and Theresienstadt (4,466; 6 transports), where most of them were murdered. Another 6,000 Jews were deported from other locations (like Vught) in the Netherlands to concentration camps in Germany, Poland and Austria (like Mauthausen). Only 5,200 survived. The Dutch underground hid an estimated number of Jews of some 25,000–30,000; eventually, an estimated 16,500 Jews managed to survive the war by hiding. Some 7,000 to 8,000 survived by fleeing to countries like Spain, the United Kingdom, and Switzerland, or by being married to non-Jews (which saved them from deportation and possible death). At the same time, there was substantial collaboration with the Nazis from members of the Dutch population, including the Amsterdam city administration, the Dutch municipal police, and Dutch railway workers, who all helped to round up and deport Jews.

One of the best known Holocaust victims in the Netherlands is Anne Frank. Along with her sister, Margot Frank, she died from typhus in March 1945 in the concentration camp of Bergen-Belsen. Disease was widespread in the camps because of unsanitary living conditions deliberately created by the Nazis. Anne Frank's mother, Edith Frank-Holländer, was murdered by starvation in Auschwitz. Her father, Otto Frank, survived the war. Other noted Dutch victims of the Holocaust include Etty Hillesum, whose writings were later published; Abraham Icek Tuschinski, and Edith Stein, who converted to Christianity and is a.k.a. Saint Teresa Benedicta of the Cross.

Maurice Frankenhuis built a collection of documents, authored diaries and collected artifacts spanning five decades, from World War I through World War II including hiding, and incarceration in Westerbork and Theresienstadt. His research revealed that he, together with his wife and two daughters may have been the only native Dutch family to survive as a unit.

In contrast to many other countries where all aspects of Jewish communities and culture were eradicated during the Shoah, a remarkably large proportion of rabbinic records survived in Amsterdam, making the history of Dutch Jewry unusually well documented.

Implementation of the Final Solution

Occupation 
The May 1940 invasion ended the Netherlands neutrality in World War II. Over the next two years, the Nazis worked with the existing Dutch bureaucracy to gain control of the administrative system. Rather than leaving the Dutch government independent or setting up a military occupation, the Nazis' plan for the Netherlands involved implementing a civil occupation. Leaders appointed by the Germans to head the civil administration in the Netherlands were all Nazis with a strong ideological history. Hitler's representative, the Austrian Nazi Arthur Seyss-Inquart, quickly took command of the Dutch administrative system as the Reichskommissar for the occupied Dutch territories. Hanns Albin Rauter was appointed the Higher SS and Police Chief (HSSPF). Rauter reported directly to Heinrich Himmler. One of Rauter's first initiatives involved consolidating the Dutch police under the Nazi-controlled Ministry of Justice. Rauter positioned the SS and the police to have full authority over the entire Jewish population of the occupied Netherlands. This gave the SS and the police the ability to persecute Jews in the Netherlands, and eventually implement the Final Solution. Rauter had not only the Dutch police, but 4,700 German police personnel at his disposal. After the Nazis took control of the Dutch government, there were reportedly 128 cases of suicide by Jews.

Registration 
In November 1941, the Germans forced all Jewish officials and public servants to register with the Dutch authorities. Subsequently, over 2,500 Jews lost their public positions. Only the forced removal of Dutch Jews from secondary and higher education incited a response from the public. On 10 January 1941, Seyss-Inquart mandated the registration of Jewish citizens. This decree included Jewish citizens with one Jewish grandparent. Citizens identified as Jewish had their identification cards marked with a black J. Carried always, these identification cards were a useful tool for the perpetrator to distinguish who was Jewish. Furthermore, these identification cards were nearly impossible to forge. The birth, death, and marriage records of Jews in the Netherlands were marked to differentiate them from the non-Jewish citizenry. By 1942, Jews were forced to wear a yellow star on their clothing. 

The geography of the Netherlands made it impossible for Jews to flee. The country of Holland is less than 20,000 square miles of flatlands. During the civil occupation, it is estimated that 25,000 Jews in the Netherlands went into hiding. Of these 25,000, a third were caught and deported. Of those who survived, 4,000 were little children. Some were betrayed by friends, or strangers who agreed to hide them under false pretenses. Others were caught by the police.

Robbery 
Before being deported and murdered, Dutch Jews were systematically robbed of all of their possessions, including businesses, real estate, financial assets, artworks and household possessions.  Gerard Aalders, a Dutch researcher at the Netherlands State Institute for War Documentation, estimated that the Dutch Jewish community was "the most affected by German rapacity". Looting organisations included the Dienststelle Muhlmann, headed by Kajetan Mühlmann under Seyss-Inquart, and the LIRO bank, a Jewish bank called Lippmann & Rosenthal & Co. that had been taken over by Nazis to disguise theft as legal transactions, among others.

Deportations 

When Seyss-Inquart and Rauter gained power over the Dutch administration, there were 140,000 Jews in the country. As many as 80,000 Dutch Jews lived in Amsterdam alone. The residency status of Jews in the Netherlands was irrelevant to Seyss-Inquart and Rauter. Seyss-Inquart stated "The Jews for us, are not Dutchmen. They are those enemies with whom we can come neither to an armistice nor to a peace". Rauter sent progress letters to Himmler informing him that "In all of Holland some 120,000 Jews are being readied for departure." These "departures" that Rauter spoke of were the deportations of Dutch Jews to concentration and extermination camps.

Breakdown of deportations from 1940 to 1945 
From 1941 to 1942, 1,700 Jews were sent to Mauthausen from Amsterdam, and 100 Jews were deported to Buchenwald, Dachau, Neuengamme (and later Auschwitz).  From 1940 to 1941, an estimated 100 Jews were sent from German prisons to different concentration camps, then to Auschwitz. Over 2,000 Jews were taken from occupied France and Belgium to Auschwitz; all but 100 were murdered. From 15 July 1942 to 23 February 1943 an estimated 42,915 Jews were deported from Westerbork to Auschwitz. Only 85 survived. From 20 August to 8 December 1942, 3,540 Jews were taken to different forced labor camps. Of these, there were 181 survivors. 34,313 Jews were deported to Sobibor from 2 March to 20 July 1943, and all but 19 were murdered. From 24 August 1943 to 3 September 1944, 11,985 Jews were deported from Westerbork to Auschwitz. Of this deportation, 588 lived. From 15 November 1943 to 3 June 1944, 1,645 Jews were sent from Vught to Auschwitz, there were 198 survivors. From 1943 to 1944, 4,870 Jews were sent from Amsterdam and Westerbork to Theresienstadt. Of the almost 5,000 Jews sent to Theresienstadt, 1,950 survived. In October 1943, 150 Jews were sent from Westerbork to Buchenwald and Ravensbrück. In 1944, 3,751 Jews were deported from Westerbork to Bergen-Belsen. This transport had the highest rate of survival, with 2,050 Jews surviving.

107,000 Jews were deported from the Netherlands and German prisons to concentration camps, then Auschwitz. Of these, only 5,200 survived. In total there were 102,000 Jews who were murdered by the Nazis (three-quarters of the pre-war Jewish population in the country). Some were Native Dutch, and others were refugees who attempted to seek asylum in the Netherlands.

See also 

 
 Battle of the Netherlands
 Israel–Netherlands relations
 List of Dutch Jews
 List of Jews deported from Wageningen (1942-1943)
 Mediene
 Righteous Among the Nations
 The Holocaust in Belgium
 The Holocaust in France
 Reichskommissariat Niederlande
 Yad Vashem

References